Sir John Key, 1st Baronet (16 August 1794 – 14 July 1858) was a wholesale stationer and Whig politician in England.

He was elected Sheriff of the City of London in 1824 and Lord Mayor of London for two years, from 1830 to 1832.

He was elected at the 1832 general election as a member of parliament (MP) for the City of London, but resigned his seat on 5 August 1833 by taking the Chiltern Hundreds. During his parliamentary career he supported the abolition of slavery, the repeal of part of the assessed taxes, abrogation of the Corn Laws, the adoption of triennial parliaments and the vote by ballot.

He was made a baronet in 1831, of Thornbury and Denmark Hill. In 1853 he ran for election to the office of Chamberlain of the City of London, emerging victorious after a closely fought contest with the young liveryman Benjamin Scott. He died in the office of Chamberlain, and Scott was elected unopposed in his stead.

He died at his home in Streatham on 14 July 1858 and was buried at West Norwood Cemetery.

John Key married Charlotte Green on 17 Aug 1814.  They had five children:
 Kingsmill Grove (born 7 May 1815)
 Thomas Kelly (10 July 1819)
 Elizabeth Susan (13 March 1821)
 Lucy Wilson (18 November 1822)
 Charlotte Marian (7 May 1826)
Lucy Wilson Key married George Parbury (his second wife) on 22 March 1849 at St Mary, Thornbury in Gloucestershire.

References

External links 

1794 births
1858 deaths
Members of the Parliament of the United Kingdom for English constituencies
UK MPs 1832–1835
19th-century lord mayors of London
19th-century English politicians
Baronets in the Baronetage of the United Kingdom
Whig (British political party) MPs for English constituencies
Sheriffs of the City of London
Burials at West Norwood Cemetery